Roarin' Guns is a 1936 American Western film directed by Sam Newfield.

Plot summary 
During a range war, the Cattleman's Association send Tim Corwin where he helps out his old friends Bob and Buddy Morgan as well as May Carter.

Cast 
Tim McCoy as Tim Corwin
Rosalinda Price as May Carter
Wheeler Oakman as Walton
Rex Lease as Jerry
John Elliott as Bob Morgan
Karl Hackett as Evans
Richard Alexander as "Bull" Langdon
Jack Rockwell as Dave Barry
Ed Cassidy as Sheriff
Tommy Bupp as Buddy Morgan

Soundtrack

External links 

1936 films
American Western (genre) films
1930s English-language films
American black-and-white films
1936 Western (genre) films
Films directed by Sam Newfield
1930s American films